Navy Island is a small, uninhabited island in the Niagara River in the province of Ontario, managed by Parks Canada as a National Historic Site of Canada. It is across from the town of Grand Island, New York, US. It was designated a national historic site in 1921 in recognition of its role in shipbuilding and the location of the short-lived Republic of Canada. The site is closed to the public, has no visitor facilities, and has not allowed camping since the expiration of a lease with the Niagara Parks Commission.

History

Navy Island was settled by the Lamoka people in approximately 2000 BC and Meadowood culture peoples in 1000 BC.

During the French colonization of New France, Navy Island was known as Île de la Marina.  Here or nearby the French built four ships (bateaux) that they used to service the Great Lakes. Two of these vessels were burnt by the French on Grand Island in 1759. When New France was ceded to the British in 1763, the latter set up the Navy Island Royal Naval Shipyard here. In the War of 1812, a detachment of the Provincial Marine was stationed on the island with a blockhouse and storehouse built on the southwest side of the island. The shipyard ceased operations around 1813, but was not transferred to Canada (Upper Canada) until 1822.

In 1837, William Lyon Mackenzie and about 200 of his supporters captured the island and proclaimed the Republic of Canada there. The old blockhouse was occupied by the rebel forces. Initially Mackenzie started with twenty-five men, but the population eventually swelled to over six hundred men. On January 11, 1838, the rebels were forced from the island and retreated across the river into the United States.

In 1875, the Queens Hotel was established as a popular summer resort on the island's south side.  It was destroyed by fire in 1910.

Farms and orchards were located on the northeast, south, central, northwest, and southwest ends of the island. Since abandoned, most of the farmed lands have been re-forested. Most trees on the island are oak or hickory. There are some reminders of habitation on the south side. A pier still exists that once served boaters to the island (although access to the island is closed to the general public and used only by Parks Canada staff). Permits were needed for camping, but camping has since been prohibited. A commemorative plaque for the island is located on the south shore of the Niagara River.

Navy Island was proposed to be the new World Peace Capital and headquarters of the United Nations by an international committee in 1945 and 1946. The island was considered to be an ideal location as it lay on the boundary between two peaceful countries. An artist's rendering of the World Peace Capital showed the property with bridges spanning both countries (at Grand Island in the US and the Canadian mainland on the other side).  It was proposed that Navy Island would be ceded to the United Nations as long as the headquarters remained, and to revert to the Canadian government should the U.N. move. The proposal was ultimately turned down in favour of the current U.N. headquarters in New York City.

References

External links
 Navy Island National Historic Site

Upper Canada Rebellion
Parks in Ontario
Landforms of the Regional Municipality of Niagara
National Historic Sites in Ontario
Uninhabited islands of Ontario
Islands of the Niagara River
River islands of Ontario